The Glenwood Inn was "one of the best known summer resorts in this section of the state and Hornell's leading place of recreation". The Inn opened in 1895. Adjacent to it were a dance hall, which also served as a skating rink, a bandstand/pavilion, merry-go-round, picnic tables, a tennis court, and a boathouse where rowboats could be rented for use in an artificial lake created by a small dam on the Canisteo River. Boys could swim in the river (few girls were interested), and "trails for hiking ran back up on the hill through the glen". It was a venue for concerts by the Canisteo Band or one from a neighboring community, banquets, dances, and picnics. "Not a day goes but what a more or less large party visits the spot". No alcohol was served. On Sundays there were excursion trains to it. In the winter it was closed.

The entire complex was destroyed by fire in 1923.

See also
Hornell Traction Company

References

Buildings and structures in Steuben County, New York
1923 fires in the United States
1923 disestablishments in New York (state)
Resorts in New York (state)
Defunct resorts
1895 establishments in New York (state)
Hornell, New York
Canisteo, New York
Burned buildings and structures in the United States
Hotels established in 1895
Hotels disestablished in 1923